This is a summary of 1994 in music in the United Kingdom, including the official charts from that year.

Summary
The first number one single of the year was the 700th since charts began, a reggae version of "Twist and Shout" by Chaka Demus & Pliers. The next month saw Mariah Carey get her first solo UK number 1 with "Without You", after having 8 previous chart-toppers in the United States. Coincidentally, "Without You" did not top the US Billboard Hot 100.

In late May, Wet Wet Wet reached number 1 with "Love Is All Around", from the film Four Weddings and a Funeral. It would remain at number 1 for fifteen weeks, the second longest consecutive run at No. 1 ever in the UK Singles Chart, and become the biggest selling single of the year. When Danish singer Whigfield replaced it in September with "Saturday Night", she became the first ever act to enter the UK singles chart at No.1 with their debut single.

Manchester rockers Oasis found their success on their debut album, Definitely Maybe, which shot to number No. 1 on its first week out in September.

December saw the debut of Boyzone to the charts, with a No. 2 cover of Johnny Bristol's "Love Me for a Reason" (also a 1974 No. 1 for The Osmonds). They would go on to have another fifteen singles, six reaching No. 1 and the rest reaching the top five, as well as four No. 1 albums.

Aside from Wet Wet Wet and Whigfield, the only other million selling single this year came from Céline Dion, with "Think Twice" (though it wouldn't reach number 1 until 1995). In all, 15 singles topped the chart this year, the second lowest number for any year in the decade.

1994 also saw a first for Prince, who scored his only British chart-topper with "The Most Beautiful Girl in the World".

This was the year when Karl Jenkins, soon to be the UK's favourite classical composer, launched his crossover project, Adiemus, with the album, Adiemus: Songs of Sanctuary. Popularised through its use in TV commercials, the title track became known to classical and popular music fans alike. It also made the name of vocalist Miriam Stockley.

Another British composer, Stephen Warbeck, won the Drama Desk Award for Outstanding Music in a Play, awarded for achievements in Broadway theatre; the award was made for his music for a production of An Inspector Calls.

A record was broken in 1994 for the longest song to become a UK top 10 hit when Bon Jovi released the single "Dry County" in March, when it peaked at #9. The song was 9 minutes and 52 seconds long.

Events
 17 February - Members of then unknown band Oasis are deported from Amsterdam for starting a drunken brawl with football fans on a ferry.  All but Noel Gallagher (who wasn't present in the incident) are arrested and deported, and the incident would be referenced in an interview between Liam and Noel that was later released on the "Wibbling Rivalry" single.
 11 April - Oasis release their debut single "Supersonic", it reaches No.31 on the Official Singles Chart but would eventually sell over 215,000 copies and would later become their 13th best selling single of all time.
 9 May - Wet Wet Wet release their cover of "Love Is All Around" as a single, it would chart at No.4, before rising to No.2 and then spent 15 weeks at No.1 on the Official Charts.
 6 July - Oasis are banned for life from Columbia Hotel, London, after trashing the bar and rooms there, as well as throwing furniture from their room which lands on the car of the hotel's manager.
 8 July - Bernard Butler leaves Suede, during the recording of their 2nd album Dog Man Star due to tensions with Brett Anderson.  Butler would be replaced by Richard Oakes.
 9 August - A riot breaks out at an Oasis gig at Newcastle's Riverside after an audience member punches Noel Gallagher, resulting in him damaging a guitar that was given to him by Johnny Marr.  Noel would require stitches as a result of the attack. 
 23 August - The KLF burn one million pounds sterling of their own royalties in a disused boathouse on the Ardfin Estate on the Scottish island of Jura. Bill Drummond was initially unrepentant about the decision, but in 2004 later admitted that he regretted burning the money.
 29 August - Oasis release their debut album Definitely Maybe, it sells 100,000 copies within just 4 days of release and earned them the record for fastest selling debut album in British history.
 6 September - Wet Wet Wet delete their "Love Is All Around" single, after 15 weeks at No.1, admitting at the time that they were "sick of it" and that they wanted to concentrate on new material.  The single drops to No.2, and as a result, they fall short of tieing with Bryan Adams' record of 16 consecutive weeks at No.1.
 29 October - Pink Floyd finish what would be their final tour, at Earls Court, in support of their The Division Bell album.  This would be the last time the 3 members would perform together until a one-off reunion with Roger Waters at Live 8 in 2005.
 2 December - Andrew Lloyd Webber is admitted to hospital for ulcer treatment.
 21 December - Richey Edwards gives what would be his final live appearance with the Manic Street Preachers at the London Astoria.  The concert ends with the band smashing their equipment.

Charts

Number-one singles

Number-one albums

Number-one compilation albums

Year-end charts

Best-selling singles

Best-selling albums

Best-selling compilation albums

Notes:

Classical music: new works
Thomas Adès – Living Toys
Peter Maxwell Davies – Symphony No. 5
Graham Fitkin – Length
Jonathan Harvey – One Evening...
Alun Hoddinott – The Silver Swimmer, Op. 152/1 – for soprano and ensemble
Michael Nyman – MGV
John Rutter – "I will sing with the spirit"

Opera
Harrison Birtwistle – The Second Mrs Kong
Andy Vores – Freshwater
Judith Weir – Blond Eckbert

Film and incidental music
Richard Rodney Bennett – Four Weddings and a Funeral.
Howard Goodall – The Vicar of Dibley (setting of Psalm 23)

Musical films
Backbeat
Brave

Music awards

Brit Awards
The 1994 Brit Awards winners were:

 Best soundtrack: "The Bodyguard"
 Best British producer: Brian Eno
 Best selling album & Single: Meat Loaf
 British album: Stereo MC's – "Connected"
 British breakthrough act: Gabrielle
 British dance act: M People
 British female solo artist: Dina Carroll
 British group: Stereo MC's
 British male solo artist: Sting
 British single: Take That – "Pray"
 British video: Take That – "Pray"
 International breakthrough act: Björk
 International female: Björk
 International group: Crowded House
 International male: Lenny Kravitz
 Outstanding contribution: Van Morrison

Mercury Music Prize
The 1994 Mercury Music Prize was awarded to M People – Elegant Slumming.

Births
1 February – Harry Styles, singer (One Direction)
1 April – Ella Eyre, English singer-songwriter
5 May – Celeste, American-born singer
2 August – Jacob Collier, jazz pianist and singer 
23 September – Andrew Johnston, boy soprano
24 November – Reece Mastin, English-Australian singer-songwriter

Deaths
6 February – Norman Del Mar, conductor, horn player, and music writer, 74
1 March – Tim Souster, songwriter and composer of electronic music, 51 
23 March – Donald Swann, pianist, composer and comedy entertainer, 70 
7 April – Lee Brilleaux, vocalist with Dr. Feelgood, 41 (lymphoma)
23 May – Ronald Hanmer, conductor, composer and arranger, 77
14 June – Lionel Grigson, jazz pianist, cornettist, trumpeter, composer and teacher, 52
26 June – Thomas Armstrong, organist, conductor, composer, educationalist and adjudicator, 96
29 July – William Mathias, composer, 57
31 July – Anne Shelton, British singer, 70
15 August – Syd Dale, composer, 70
2 September – Roy Castle, musician and all-round entertainer, 62 (lung cancer)
6 September – Nicky Hopkins, pianist and organist, 50 (complications from intestinal surgery)
7 September – Eric Crozier, librettist, 79
20 September – Jule Styne, English-born American songwriter, 88
22 September – Leonard Feather, jazz pianist, composer, producer and music journalist, 80
11 November – Elizabeth Maconchy, composer, 87

See also
 1994 in British radio
 1994 in British television
 1994 in the United Kingdom
 List of British films of 1994

References

External links
 BBC Radio 1's Chart Show
 The Official United Kingdom Charts Company
 everyhit – Music database

 
British music
Music
British music by year
20th century in music